Vladimir Azhazha may refer to two persons:
Vladimir Azhazha (physicist) (1931–2009)
Vladimir Azhazha (ufologist) (1927–2018)